North Foreland Lodge was a private boarding school for girls in England, originally established at North Foreland in Kent. Displaced from there by the Second World War, in 1947 it settled at Sherfield Manor in Sherfield on Loddon, Hampshire, until its closure in 2003 shortly after being acquired by another school, Gordonstoun.

In 2004 Gordonstoun sold the school site to a group of schools called Gems Education (an international company which runs schools in the Middle East), which converted it into a new mixed-sex independent school called Sherfield School.

History
The school was founded in 1909 at North Foreland, near Broadstairs in Kent, by Mary Wolseley-Lewis, who at the time was the head of the Francis Holland School in Graham Street, Westminster, SW1. This event came as a shock to the Francis Holland School, especially when its departing head took several girls and members of staff with her. Miss Wolseley-Lewis had herself been educated by Dorothea Beale at Cheltenham Ladies College.

The Journal of Education reported on the opening of the school: 

As a result of the Second World War, the school had to evacuate its premises in Kent, and it then had several temporary homes, including a hotel.

On 3 December 1981 Queen Margrethe II of Denmark, who had been educated at North Foreland Lodge in the 1950s, opened the school's new music wing.

By 1982 there were 160 girls, all of whom were boarders. The core curriculum consisted of English, French, mathematics, history, geography, biology, chemistry, physics, and religious knowledge. Other subjects taught included Latin, Italian, Russian, Spanish, classical studies, history of art, music, sociology, and computer studies. About half of the girls learnt a musical instrument, and the main school sports were lacrosse, gymnastics, tennis, netball, swimming, and rounders. By 1989 overall numbers were up to 189, with fifty girls in the sixth form.

In 1995, North Foreland Lodge was reported to be one of the few schools willing to accommodate pet rabbits. A charge of £2 per rabbit per term was made for sawdust and straw.

In the year 2000, the school was in the news when it was revealed that J. K. Rowling had given permission for its girls to perform a dramatisation of her Harry Potter and the Philosopher's Stone, and was in the news again two weeks later when Rowling changed her mind at the last minute, after realising that this would be a world premiere. Rowling arranged a personal visit to the school by way of apology. Headmistress Susan Cameron commented to The Times "We were over the moon when we got permission, so this was a real bolt from the blue, like the magic wand of an evil wizard."

In 2002 the school was in financial difficulties, largely due to leading boys' schools becoming mixed and parents moving girls to them to take their A-Levels. Gordonstoun School, supported by some members of the school's own governing body, made a bid to acquire it, and the success of this bid was announced in March 2002, when it was revealed that a new mixed-sex prep school was to be built in the grounds of Sherfield Manor and that North Foreland would continue as a girls-only senior school. A further announcement in The Times on 17 April 2002 stated that "The School is now one of the Gordonstoun Schools", adding that Nigel Havers would present the prizes at Carnival Day on 6 July. However, a year after Gordonstoun had bought North Foreland Lodge for a figure reported to be £1 million, the school was closed, leading to allegations of asset stripping. In January 2004 the school's site was sold to the Varkeys group for £6 million.

In February 2004 a company named GEMS Education acquired the former school, re-opening it for business in September as Sherfield School, a co-educational day school for children of all ages. In 2005 The Times reported that the new school had been planned to cater for 1,500 children but was failing to reach "critical mass", with the small numbers appearing forlorn. A North Foreland Lodge Hundredth Anniversary drinks party was held in London on 5 March 2009.

Headmistresses
1909–1931: Mary Wolseley-Lewis (born 1865, died 1955) 
1943–1967: Fenella M. Gammell
1967–1983: Dorothea Rosemary Katharine Irvine MA (Oxon.), (born 1922, known as Rosemary Irvine)
1983–1996: Diana Matthews
1996–2002: Susan Ruth Cameron

Notable former pupils

In chronological order; see also :Category:People educated at North Foreland Lodge
Angela Pery, Countess of Limerick (1897–1981), Chairman of Standing Committee of International Red Cross, 1965–1973
Dame Janet Vaughan (1899–1993), physiologist and Principal of Somerville College, Oxford
Princess Katherine of Greece and Denmark (1913–2007), daughter of King Constantine I of Greece 
Sarah Churchill (1914–1982), actress, daughter of Sir Winston Churchill
 Princess Frederica of Hanover (1917–1981), later Queen of Greece as wife of King Paul of Greece
Lady Elizabeth Montagu (1917–2006), novelist and teacher at the Royal College of Nursing
Diana Parikian (1926–2012), antiquarian bookseller
Penelope Hobhouse (born 1929), garden writer and designer and television presenter
Althea Wynne (1936–2012), sculptor
Queen Margrethe II of Denmark (born 1940)

References

External links
North Foreland Lodge c. 1955, photograph at francisfrith.com 
North Foreland Lodge and DSCF0518, aerial photographs at flickr.com
North Foreland Lodge, photograph at pavilion-bcs.co.uk
North Foreland Lodge open group at facebook.com

Defunct schools in Hampshire
Defunct schools in Kent
Educational institutions disestablished in 2003
Educational institutions established in 1909
Girls' schools in Hampshire
Girls' schools in Kent
1909 establishments in England
2003 disestablishments in England